Surat is a district in the state of Gujarat, India with Surat city as the administrative headquarters of this district. It is surrounded by Bharuch, Narmada (North), Navsari  (South) districts and east Tapi district To the west is the Gulf of Cambay. It is the second-most advanced district in Gujarat. It had a population of 6,081,322 of which 79.68% were urban as of 2011.
On 2 October 2007 Surat district was split into two by the creation of a new Tapi district, under the Surat District Re-organisation Act 2007.

As of 2011 it is the 12th most populous district of India (out of 640), and the second most populous district of Gujarat (out of 33) after Ahmadabad.

Geography
Surat District's total area is 4,418 km 2, and the density of Surat District was 1,376 per km 2 at the 2011 Census. The region has the highest population density in the State, followed by Ahmedabad region. There are 10 sub-districts in Surat district. These include Surat city, Mandvi, Bardoli, Palsana, Mahuva, Kamrej,  Mangrol, Choryasi, Olpad and Umarpada.

Climate
Surat has a tropical savanna climate (Köppen: Aw), moderated strongly by the Sea to the Gulf of Cambay. The summer begins in early March and lasts until June. April and May are the hottest months, the average maximum temperature being . October and November see the retreat of the monsoon and a return of high temperatures until late November.

Since the 20th century, Surat has experienced 14 floods. In 1968, most parts of the city were flooded and in 1994 a flood caused a country-wide plague outbreak, Surat being the epicenter. In 1998, 30 per cent of Surat had gone under water due to flooding in Tapti river following release of water from Ukai dam located 90 km from Surat and in Aug, 2006 more than 95 per cent of the city was under Tapti river waters, killing more than 120 people, stranding tens of thousands in their homes without food or electricity and closing businesses and schools for weeks.

Demographics

According to the 2011 census Surat district has a population of 6,081,322, roughly equal to the nation of El Salvador or the US state of Missouri. This gives it a ranking of 12th in India (out of a total of 640). Its population growth rate was 42.24% over the decade 2001–2011 and 54.30% over the decade 1991–2001. Surat has a sex ratio of 788 females for every 1000 males, and a literacy rate of 86.5%. 79.74% of the population lives in urban areas. Scheduled Castes and Scheduled Tribes make up 2.60% and 14.09% of the population respectively.

Religion

Hinduism is the main religion. Islam and Jainism are also present.

Language

At the time of the 2011 census, 60.06% of the population spoke Gujarati, 19.62% Hindi, 8.03% Marathi, 2.60% Odia, 2.47% Urdu, 1.44% Marwari, 1.30% Bhojpuri and 1.01% Chodri as their first language.

Politics
  

|}

Culture

Places of tourist interest in Surat are the old fort build by Muhammad bin Tughluq, the beautiful beaches of Ubhrat and Dumas , the villages of Bardoli.

Industry at a Glance 

The above details has been taken from Brief Industrial Profile of Surat District

Notable personalities
 Narmadashankar Dave (1833–1886) Author, poet, scholar and public speaker. Born in Surat.
 Shaikh Randeri (a.k.a. Shaikh Raneri) was famous for spreading the Islamic faith to Indonesia.
 Navalram (1836–1888) Author and literary critic. Born in Surat.
 Ranjitram Mehta (1881–1917) Author. Born in Surat.
 Gunvant Shah (1937– ) Author. Born in Rander, Surat.

See also
List of tourist attractions in Surat
Barbodhan
Raniamba
Udhana Taluka

References

External links

 Official website
 Collectorate site

 
Districts of Gujarat